The Liberal Party 1993 (or PL '93 for short) was a liberal political party in Romania which was active between 1993 and 1997, formed in 1993 after the merger of PNL-AT with a faction of the PNL-CD (which was led by Niculae Cerveni).

It subsequently fully merged with the PNL-CD on 14 June 1997. Throughout its existence, the party had sided itself with the Romanian Democratic Convention (CDR), exactly as PNL-AT and PNL-CD led by Niculae Cerveni, and as opposed to the PNL-C led by Radu Câmpeanu. On 7 September 1998, PL '93 had officially re-integrated itself in the main National Liberal Party (PNL).

Notable members 

One of PL '93 most notable members was future PNL president Ludovic Orban, who initially worked as a political advisor for the party between 1993 and 1997.

References 

National Liberal Party
Conservative parties in Romania
Liberal parties in Romania
1993 establishments in Romania